Polly Billington (born 1967) is a former BBC journalist who worked on the Today programme before becoming a special advisor to Ed Miliband. She was the media director for his successful bid in the 2010 Labour leadership election. Billington was the Labour Party's parliamentary candidate for Thurrock at the 2015 general election and a Labour Party official. She is the director of  UK100, and councillor for De Beauvoir ward in the London Borough of Hackney.

Education and journalism career
Billington went to Grays Convent High School in Grays Thurrock and took a postgraduate diploma in Broadcast Journalism at the department of Journalism, Media and Communication, University of Central Lancashire in 1993.

Billington was a BBC reporter for the Today programme, Newsbeat on Radio 1, News 24 and the Politics Show.

Labour Party official and candidate
She became a special adviser to Ed Miliband in 2007 when he was working on party policy and election strategy in the Cabinet Office and according to The Daily Telegraph she was the 59th most influential person on the UK left in 2011.
 
Billington sought to become a parliamentary candidate in February 2010, when she was shortlisted for the safe Labour seat of North Tyneside, but local candidate Mary Glindon was selected instead. She was the media director for Ed Miliband's successful Labour leadership bid. Some credited her with honing his questions and replies to David Cameron at Prime Minister's Questions, though critics blamed her for the disorganisation of his campaign and in particular his poor performances during Prime Minister's Questions 

In November 2011, Billington launched another bid to be selected as a Labour MP, this time in Thurrock. This time she gained the nomination for a marginal seat. She was one of 15 Labour candidates each given financial support of £10,000 by Lord Matthew Oakeshott the former Liberal Democrat in January 2015. However, she failed to win the close 3-way contest in Thurrock and came second.

She was one of two Labour Party councillors elected to De Beauvoir ward in the 2018 Hackney London Borough Council election, with 1,448 votes. She was reelected in 2022, with 1,400 votes.

Among other roles, Billington is an Executive Member of SERA, Labour's Environment Campaign

Director of UK100

Billington is the Director of UK100, the only network for UK locally elected leaders who have pledged to play their part in the global effort to avoid the worst impacts of climate change by switching to 100% clean energy by 2050. The most ambitious - UK100's Net Zero Local Leadership Club - are doing everything within their power to get their communities to Net Zero as soon as possible, and by 2045 at the latest.

She established UK100 in 2016 and is the director of the organisation. She liaises with local leaders and directly elected mayors and develops and maintains strong relationships with extensive contacts across the political and nonprofit spectrum.

References 

1967 births
Living people
Alumni of the University of Central Lancashire
BBC newsreaders and journalists
British special advisers
Labour Party (UK) officials
Labour Party (UK) parliamentary candidates
Labour Party (UK) councillors
Councillors in the London Borough of Hackney
Women councillors in England